Zac Power is an Australian children's book series by a team of writers under the corporate pseudonym H. I. Larry. The series is based upon the adventures of Zac Power, a twelve-year-old boy, and his fifteen-year-old brother, Leon. Zac is a secret agent for the fictitious intelligence agency GIB (Government Investigation Bureau), and Zac's adventures frequently see him saving the world. The series was published by Hardie Grant Egmont.

Test Drive and Spy Camp/Spy Recruit
The Test Drive and Spy Camp/Spy Recruit series are designed for younger readers, with larger print and lower word counts.  Both series are listed on the NSW Premier's Reading Challenge years 7–8 list, whereas the other Zac Power series are on the years 9–13 list.

Test Drive consists of 16 books, written by Louise Park (published 2009–2010) and Spy Camp of eight (published 2010).

Mega, Extreme, and Ultimate
The Mega Mission (2008) and Extreme Mission (2009) series each have a continuing story that spans four books. They have both also been published as single-volume “four books in one” editions. Authorship for all eight books is claimed by Chris Morphew.

Zac Power Ultimate Mission is a single-volume chapter book (264 pages).

Special Files
Published in 2011, each book in the Special Files series contains two stories from the original Zac Power series.

List of titles
Author notes: [HB] Hilary Badger; [MB] Meredith Badger; [CM] Chris Morphew; [CMi] Chris Miles; [ML] Mat Larkin;

Original series
Poison Island [HB]
Deep Waters [HB]
Mind Games [HB]
Frozen Fear [HB] [Bestseller]
Tomb of Doom [MB]
Night Raid [HB]
Lunar Strike 
Sudden Drop
Blockbuster [HB] [Bestseller]
Shockwave [Bestseller]
High Risk 
Undercover 
Sky High [CM] [Bestseller]
Volcanic Panic [CM]
Boot Camp [HB]
Swamp Race [CM]
Thrill Ride [Bestseller]
Horror House [Bestseller]
Close Shave [CM]
Shipwreck
Overdrive
River Rampage
Foul Play
Fossil Fury [CMi] [Bestseller]
Shock Music [ML] [Bestseller]

Special titles 

Ultimate Mission [CMi]

Test drive 

 Zac’s Moon Trip
 Zac’s Wild Rescue
 Zac’s Icy Pole
 Zac’s Sticky Fix
 Zac’s Freaky Frogs
 Zac’s Ski Mission
 Zac’s Bank Bust
 Zac’s Shark Attack
 Zac’s Power On
 Zac’s Water World
 Zac’s Rocket Launch
 Zac’s Skate Break
 Zac’s Double Dare
 Zac’s Quicksand
 Zac’s High Dive
 Zac’s Space Race

Spy Camp/Spy Recruit
Zac Blasts Off
Zac Strikes Out
Zac Cracks Down
Zac Climbs High
Zac Runs Wild
Zac Wipes Out
Zac Jets On
Zac Heats Up

Mega Mission
Base Camp
Code Red
Moon Rider
High Stakes
All four books published 2008; Zac Power Mega Missions collection published 2009.

Extreme Mission
 Sand Storm
 Dark Tower
 Ice Patrol
 Water Blast

All four books published 2009; Zac Power Extreme Missions collection published 2010.

Special Files
The Fear Files (consists of Horror House & Thrill Ride)
The Rock Star Files (consists of Blockbuster & Shock Music)
The Underwater Files (consists of Deep Waters & Shipwreck)
The Sky Files (consists of Sky High & Lunar Strike)
The Undercover Files (consists of Boot Camp & Undercover)
The City Files (consists of Fossil Fury & Mind Games)
The Volcano Files (consists of Poison Island & Volcanic Panic)
The Desert Files (consists of Sudden Drop & Tomb of Doom)

Film adaptation 
On 1 May 2019 Screen Australia announced an upcoming animation film called Zac Power - The Movie. Australian TV producer David Webster has been hired to direct the film, who also wrote Erky Perky. It is based on a script written by John Armstrong and will be produced by Barbara Stephen, Patrick Egerton and Celine Goetz, who have all worked on various Australian animated films.

References

External links
  https://web.archive.org/web/20060426070731/http://www.zacpower.com/

Series of children's books
Australian children's novels
Junior spy novels